The 2008 Formul'Academy Euro Series season was the sixteenth season of the series for 1600cc Formula Renault machinery, and the first under the Formul'Academy Euro Series guise.

It replaced the FFSA Formule Campus Renault Elf, and was managed by the Auto Sport Academy. The series used Signatech chassis powered by Renault K4MRS 1600cc engines. Rounds were contested in France, Belgium, Czech Republic and United Kingdom at 7 venues.

Race calendar and results

Championship standings

Drivers
 Points were awarded to the drivers as follows:

References

External links
 The official website of the Formul'Academy Euro Series 

2008 in French motorsport
Formul'Academy